Rock Island is the 17th studio album by the British rock group Jethro Tull, released in 1989. The album continued the hard rock direction the band took on the previous effort, Crest of a Knave (1987). The line-up now included Ian Anderson, Martin Barre, Dave Pegg and drummer Doane Perry in his first full recording with the band, although he had already been a member of Jethro Tull since 1984. Without a permanent keyboard player, the role was shared by Fairport Convention's Maartin Allcock and former Tull member Peter Vettese.

Rock Island went Gold in the UK, with good sales also in Germany, where it peaked at No. 5. "Kissing Willie" was a hit on Rock radio, reaching No. 6 on the US Mainstream Rock Chart.

The staging on the 1989 tour supporting Rock Island featured projected silhouettes of lithe dancers during "Kissing Willie", ending with an image that bordered on pornographic. The song "Big Riff and Mando" reflects life on the road for the relentlessly touring musicians, giving a wry account of the theft of Barre's prized mandolin by a stage-struck fan.

Track listing

The bonus tracks were recorded live in Zurich, Switzerland on 13 October 1989. They had previously been released on the UK CD single of "Another Christmas Song".

Personnel
Jethro Tull
 Ian Anderson – vocals, flute, acoustic guitar, keyboards, Synclavier, mandolin, drums, percussion (on tracks 2 & 7)
 Martin Barre – acoustic guitar, electric guitar
 David Pegg – bass guitar, acoustic bass, mandolin
 Doane Perry – drums, percussion

Additional personnel

 Maartin Allcock – keyboards (on tracks 1 & 10)
 Peter-John Vettese – additional keyboards (on tracks 3-6)
 Jim Gibson - illustrations
 Mark Tucker - mixing

Charts

Certifications

References

Jethro Tull (band) albums
1989 albums
Chrysalis Records albums
Progressive rock albums by British artists